Antiochus is a  Greek male first name, which was a dynastic name for rulers of the Seleucid Empire and the Kingdom of Commagene. 
In Jewish historical memory, connected with the Maccabean Revolt and the holiday of Hanukkah, "Antiochus" refers specifically to Antiochus IV Epiphanes. 

Antiochus may refer to:

The Seleucid Empire
 Antiochus (father of Seleucus I Nicator) (born 4th-century BC), father of Seleucus I Nicator, founder of the Hellenistic Seleucid Empire
 Antiochus I Soter (died 261 BC), king of the Seleucid Empire
 Antiochus II Theos (286 BC–246 BC), king of the Seleucid Empire who reigned 261 BC–246 BC
 Antiochus Hierax (died 226 BC), rebel brother of Seleucus II Callinicus
 Antiochus III the Great (241–187 BC, king 222–187 BC), younger son of Seleucus II Callinicus, became the 6th ruler of the Seleucid Empire
 Antiochus (son of Antiochus III the Great), the first son of Antiochus III the Great
 Antiochus IV Epiphanes (215 BC–164 BC), ruler of the Seleucid Empire from 175 BC until 164 BC
 Antiochus V Eupator (173 BC–162 BC), ruler of the Seleucid Empire who reigned 164–162 BC
 Antiochus VI Dionysus (148–138 BC), king of the Seleucid Empire, son of Alexander Balas and Cleopatra Thea
 Antiochus VII Sidetes (died 129 BC), king of the Seleucid Empire, reigned from 138 to 129 BC
 Antiochus VIII Grypus (died 96 BC), ruler of the Seleucid Empire, son of Demetrius II Nicator
 Antiochus IX Cyzicenus (died 96 BC), ruler of the Seleucid Empire, son of Antiochus VII Sidetes and Cleopatra Thea, half-brother of Antiochus VIII
 Antiochus X Eusebes (died 83 BC), ruler of the Seleucid Empire from 95 BC
 Antiochus XI Epiphanes (died 92 BC), ruler of the Seleucid Empire, son of Antiochus VIII Grypus and brother of Seleucus VI Epiphanes
 Antiochus XII Dionysus (Epiphanes/Philopator/Callinicus), ruler of the Seleucid Empire reigned 87–84 BC; fifth son of Antiochus VIII Grypus 
 Antiochus XIII Asiaticus (died 64 BC), one of the last rulers of the Seleucid Empire
 Antiochus, the infant son of Antiochus II Theos
 Antiochus, first son of Seleucus IV Philopator

Kingdom of Commagene
 Antiochus I Theos of Commagene (died 38 BC), reigned 70 BC-38 BC
 Antiochus II of Commagene (died 29 BC)
 Antiochus III of Commagene (died 17 AD), reigned 12 BC–17 AD
 Antiochus IV of Commagene, reigned 38-72

Princes of Commagene
 Gaius Julius Archelaus Antiochus Epiphanes (38–92 AD)
 Gaius Julius Antiochus Epiphanes Philopappos (65–116)

Others
 Antiochus (mythology), name of five figures in Greek mythology
 Antiochus of Alexandria, writer on Greek comedy
 Antiochus, an epigrammatic poet, one of whose epigrams is extant in the Greek Anthology
 Antiochus of Laodicea, a sceptic philosopher, and a disciple of Zeuxis; see Laodicea on the Lycus
 Antiochus (sculptor), a sculptor of ancient Greece from Athens
 Antiochus of Syracuse (c. 423 BC), Greek historian 
 Antiochus (admiral), Athenian admiral of Alcibiades (407 BC)
 Antiochus of Arcadia, Greek envoy to Persia (4th century BC)
 Antiochus of Antioch, villainous king in Apollonius of Tyre legend
 Antiochus, villainous king in Shakespeare's Pericles, Prince of Tyre
 Antiochus of Ascalon (c. 130–68 BC), philosopher, member of Plato's Academy 
 Antiochus of Sulcis (died 110), Christian martyr from Sardinia
 Antiochus of Athens (c. 100 CE), philosopher and astrologer
 Antiochus Philometor (c. 2nd century CE), ancient physician
 Antiochus (physician) (c. 2nd century CE), ancient physician, different from above
 Publius Anteius Antiochus (c. 200 CE), otherwise known as Antiochus of Aegae, a sophist or Cynic philosopher
 Septimius Antiochus (died 273), last Palmyrene Emperor (273)
 Antiochus (praepositus sacri cubiculi), Byzantine courtier and imperial tutor
 Antiochus bishop of Ptolemais, 5th century bishop
 Antiochus Chuzon, 5th-century politician of the Byzantine Empire
 Antiochus of Palestine, 7th-century monk
 Antiochos (strategos of Sicily), Byzantine governor of Sicily

Fictional

 Antiochus 'Tony' Wilson, protagonist of Seconds (1966 film)

See also
Antiochis, female version of the name
Antiochianus, a surname
 Antiochia (disambiguation)